The Höheres Kommando z.b.V. LXV (en : Higher Command for Special Duties LXV) was a special Corps in the German Army during World War II.

History 
The Corps was formed on 21 May 1941 in Schneidemühl in Wehrkreis II, to replaced German combat troops that had participated in the Invasion of Yugoslavia  (6–18 April 1941). 
In February 1942, the commander became also the representative commander-in-chief of Serbia. 
On 1 March 1942, the Corps was expanded to 4 divisions and became the Occupation Force of the Territory of the Military Commander in Serbia.

Commanders

 General der Artillerie Paul Bader (25 May 1941 - 1 March 1942).

Composition

 704th Infantry Division, headquartered at Valjevo in the west 
 714th Infantry Division, headquartered at Topola roughly in the centre of the territory 
 717th Infantry Division, headquartered at Niš
 718th Infantry Division, was deployed in the adjacent parts of the NDH.

See also
 List of German corps in World War II

External links

zbV,65
Military units and formations established in 1941
Military units and formations disestablished in 1942
1941 establishments in Germany